Hamza Ménina (born 1981) is a retired Algerian triple jumper.

He finished sixth at the 2002 African Championships, won the silver medal at the 2004 African Championships, and the bronze medal at the 2005 Islamic Solidarity Games.

His personal best jump is 16.04 metres, achieved in October 2004 in Algiers.

References

1981 births
Living people
Algerian male triple jumpers
Islamic Solidarity Games competitors for Algeria
Islamic Solidarity Games medalists in athletics
21st-century Algerian people
20th-century Algerian people